Hiromichi Sakamoto (born 1962) is a Japanese avant-garde composer and cellist in the Japanoise and jazz art scene. Along with the cello, he uses voices and musical saws in his work. He is also known for playing the cello with various objects like drill machine, grinding machine and adult vibrator.

He has collaborated with many other musicians like Haco, Catherine Jauniaux, Lars Hollmer, and Level & Tyson.

Hiromichi was featured in the documentary "We Don't Care About Music Anyway" from 2009.

References 

1962 births
Avant-garde composers
Japanese cellists
Japanese composers
Japanese male composers
Living people
Date of birth missing (living people)
Place of birth missing (living people)